Fred W. Anderson was an American legislator and lawyer.

From Downers Grove, Illinois, Anderson received his bachelor's and law degrees from University of Chicago. In 1929, Anderson was admitted to the Illinois bar and practiced law in Downers Grove. In 1957 and 1958, Anderson served in the Illinois House of Representatives and was a Democrat.

References 

Year of birth unknown
Year of death unknown
People from Downers Grove, Illinois
University of Chicago alumni
Illinois lawyers
Democratic Party members of the Illinois House of Representatives